Jan Staško (born 15 April 1993) is a Czech football player.

Career
Ahead of the 2019-20 season, Staško joined Czech club SK Dětmarovice.

References

External links
 

1993 births
Living people
Czech footballers
Czech expatriate footballers
Association football forwards
FC Baník Ostrava players
FK Frýdek-Místek players
MFK Lokomotíva Zvolen players
Partizán Bardejov players
Czech National Football League players
Czech First League players
2. Liga (Slovakia) players
Expatriate footballers in Slovakia
Czech expatriate sportspeople in Slovakia